Molly Davies is a videographer or video artist. She has collaborated with John Cage, David Tudor, Takehisa Kosugi, Lou Harrison, Michael Nyman, Alvin Curran, Fred Frith, Suzushi Hanayagi, Sage Cowles, Polly Motley, Jackie Matisse, and Anne Carson.

Examples of her work include her collaboration with David Tudor and Jackie Matisse, Sea Tails.

She is on the board of directors of the  non-profit, multi-disciplinary art and performance space, The Kitchen.

Her works in the field of film, multimedia and video installations have been presented at festivals and museums around the world.

Sources

External links
Kourlas, Gia (June 9, 2009). "Dance Review: Molly Davies: Celebrating the Process More Than the Product", NYTimes.com.
"Indepth Arts News: 'Molly Davies: Retrospective of Video Installation Works'", AbsoluteArts.com.
Stein, Joshua David (Wednesday, June 3, 2009). "Pressed for Time: Molly Davies' Traditions, Inventions, Exchange", NYPress.com.
"Molly Davies", vimeo.com.

American video artists
Videographers
Living people
Year of birth missing (living people)
American women video artists
21st-century American artists
21st-century American women artists